John Rally Gilliam (born August 7, 1945) is an American former professional football player who was a wide receiver in the National Football League (NFL). He has owned a number of businesses, and for two years he worked for a radio station in Atlanta.  He has made his home in Atlanta since 1968.  His wife Fannie is an attorney, and they have four children.

Life and career
Gilliam attended Brewer High School in Greenwood, South Carolina, then played college football at South Carolina State University, from which he graduated with a degree in biology.  While in college he also lettered in track and was clocked in the 100 yard dash in 9.5 seconds, four tenths of a second off the world record at the time.  He was drafted in the second round by the expansion New Orleans Saints. He played his first two seasons in New Orleans, and then had stints with the St. Louis Cardinals from 1969 to 1971, the Minnesota Vikings from 1972 to 1975, the Atlanta Falcons in 1976, and brief stints with the Chicago Bears and back in New Orleans for 1977. Gilliam played in 2 Super Bowls with the Vikings, Super Bowl VIII and Super Bowl IX. He was elected to the Pro Bowl all four years while he was with Minnesota.

In 1972, Gilliam led the NFL in yards per catch (22) and finished 2nd in receiving yards (1,035) and receiving yards per game (73.9). In 1973, he again finished 2nd in receiving yards (907) and receiving yards per game (64.8) and was named 1st Team All-Pro by the Newspaper Enterprise Association (NEA) and 2nd Team All-Pro by the Associated Press (AP) and the Pro Football Writers Association (PFWA). He was also named 1st Team All-NFC by The Sporting News and UPI in 1973.

He is famous for returning the opening kickoff 94 yards in the Saints' inaugural game in 1967 against the Los Angeles Rams for their first touchdown in franchise history. In Super Bowl VIII, Gilliam returned the second half kickoff 65 yards to the Miami 34, but a clipping penalty wiped out almost all the yardage. One play in Super Bowl IX also resulted in Gilliam colliding with then-NFL Films cameraman (later president) Steve Sabol.

Gilliam played with the Chicago Winds of the WFL in 1975, catching 20 passes for 390 yards, 19.5 average and 2 touchdowns.  The Winds folded after 5 games and Gilliam returned to the Vikings in time for the 1975 season.  He signed with the Falcons as a free agent before the 1976 season.  The Falcons waived him after one season and he signed with the Bears for the 1977 season.  The Bears waived him after 2 games and he signed with the Saints for the remainder of the 1977 season.

References

1945 births
Living people
People from Greenwood, South Carolina
Players of American football from South Carolina
American football wide receivers
American male sprinters
South Carolina State Bulldogs football players
New Orleans Saints players
St. Louis Cardinals (football) players
Minnesota Vikings players
Atlanta Falcons players
Chicago Bears players
Chicago Winds players
National Conference Pro Bowl players
College men's track and field athletes in the United States